The 2016 Grand Prix de Fourmies was the 84th edition of the Grand Prix de Fourmies road cycling one day race. It was held on 4 September 2016 as part of UCI Europe Tour in category 1.HC.

Teams
Twenty-two teams entered the race. Each team had a maximum of eight riders:

Result

References

2016 UCI Europe Tour
2016 in French sport
Grand Prix de Fourmies